ADP-ribosylation factor-like protein 2 is a protein that in humans is encoded by the ARL2 gene.

Function 

 The ADP-ribosylation factor (ARF) genes are small GTP-binding proteins of the RAS superfamily.  ARL2 is a member of a functionally distinct group of ARF-like genes.
 In photoreceptors, ARL2 participates in the trafficking of lipidated membrane-associated proteins.
 There is an evidence that increased activity of ARL2 protein is strongly correlated with increased mitochondria fusion, while loss of ARL2 activity results in a decreased rate of fusion.

Interactions 

ARL2 has been shown to interact with Protein unc-119 homolog, TBCD and PDE6D.

References

External links

Further reading